Lambert Airport Terminal 2 is a St. Louis MetroLink station. It is an elevated station located above Lambert International Boulevard and accessed from the Terminal 2 parking garage at St. Louis-Lambert International Airport.

Terminal 2 serves Southwest Airlines, Lufthansa Airlines and other international flights.

Station layout
The platform is accessed via the upper level (departure level) of the Terminal 2 parking garage.  A set of stairs and a ramp take passengers from the garage to the station's elevator and platform stairs. There is also access from the public sidewalk on Lambert International Boulevard.

References

External links 
 St. Louis Metro

MetroLink stations in St. Louis County, Missouri
Red Line (St. Louis MetroLink)
Airport railway stations in the United States
Railway stations in the United States opened in 1998
1998 establishments in Missouri
Terminal 2 station